Erdal is a village in Askøy municipality in Vestland county, Norway.  The village is located along the Byfjorden on the southeastern coast of the island of Askøy.  The village lies in a valley just north of the mountain Kolbeinsvarden, the tallest mountain on the island.  The villages of Florvåg and Kleppestø lie just to the south of Erdal.  In 2006, Erdal Church was built in the village, serving the southeastern part of the island.  There are also two schools in Erdal: a municipal pre-school and an elementary school.

References

Villages in Vestland
Askøy